The Renault 6P, also called the Renault  Bengali, was a series of air-cooled 6-cylinder inverted in-line aero engines designed and built in France from the late 1920s, which produced from  to .

Design and development
Charles Lindbergh's Atlantic Ocean crossing in 1927 inspired Renault to enter the light aero-engine market to diversify the range of engines they offered. To complement the 4P four-cylinder engines, Renault developed the 6P series, with  bore and  stroke; by adding two cylinders of the same bore and stroke.

Developed by Charles-Edmond Serre, the  6P evolved to give , using  bore steel cylinder liners, aluminium alloy cylinder heads attached by long studs to the crankcase, Duralumin connecting rods and magnesium alloy crankcase.

The 6P was also produced in the USSR, as the MV-6,  (MV - Motor Vozdushniy / Motor Voronezhskiy - air-cooled engine / Voronezh built engine {correct interpretation is unclear}).

Variants
Renault 6Pdiinverted 6 in-line
Renault 6Pdiswith supercharger
Renault 6Pfi 
Voronezh MV-6licence production in the USSR

Applications 
Caudron C.630 Simoun
Caudron C.684
Morane-Saulnier MS.350 (Pei)
Moskalyev SAM-9 Strela
Moskalyev SAM-10bis
Moskalyev SAM-11bis

Specifications (Renault 6Pdi)

See also

References

Further reading

 

1920s aircraft piston engines
6P
Straight-six engines